Sirajullah Khadim (born June 10, 1988) is a Bangladeshi cricketer who plays for the Portuguese cricket team. He has played domestic cricket for Sylhet Division. In August 2021, he was named in Portugal's Twenty20 International (T20I) squad for the 2021 Portugal Tri-Nation Series tournament. He made his Twenty20 International (T20I) debut for Portugal, against Malta, on 19 August 2021.

Domestic career
Khadim made his debut for Sylhet Division in 2005. He played for Mohammedan Sporting Club at the age of 18.

References

External links

1988 births
Living people
Bangladeshi cricketers
Sylhet Division cricketers
Portuguese cricketers
Portugal Twenty20 International cricketers
Bangladeshi expatriates in Portugal